Jumper: Griffin's Story is a fighting video game based on the film of the same name. It was released for the PlayStation 2, Wii and Xbox 360 in 2008.  It was developed by Redtribe for the Xbox 360, and Collision Studios for the PlayStation 2 and Wii, and was published by Brash Entertainment.

Plot
The game begins with a flashback to the night a child Griffin's parents were murdered by a man and a woman.

In the present, Griffin has the ability to "jump" and is searching for Roland Cox, the head of the Paladins, a secret society of religious fanatics who are sworn to trace and kill "Jumpers". He travels to Nepal where he learns that the Paladins have long since lost the support of the monks who first trained them to sense Jump Scars, wormholes that the Jumpers leave behind when they teleport. He then finds and nearly kills Roland, but reinforcements show up, forcing Griffin to flee.

Three years later, Griffin arrives at the Colosseum, where he helps David Rice, another Jumper, fight off a group of Paladins. After the fight, Griffin interrogates a Paladin who reveals that the Paladins are heading to Tokyo. After a failed attack on his base by the Paladins, Griffin heads to Tokyo.

In Tokyo, Griffin discovers that the Paladins are stealing a machine that permits others to follow Jumpers through Jump Scars. He tries to stop them and nearly kills the man and woman who killed his parents, but fails and the Paladins escape with the machine.

While nursing his wounds at his lair, the Paladins arrive using the machine to jump through one of David's past Jump Scars. After a country spanning duel, Roland escapes through a Jump Scar and leaves the man who killed Griffin's parents to deal with him.

After an intense fight in Nepal, he questions the high-ranking Paladin as to the identity of the woman who killed his parents. The Paladin laughs and says that David knows her. Griffin kills him and vows to destroy all the remaining Paladins and get revenge on the woman who killed his parents.

Critical reception

The game received "generally unfavorable reviews" on all platforms, according to the review aggregation website Metacritic.

In Game Informers Andrew Reiner's short review, he referenced the burial site of thousands of cartridges of E.T. the Extra-Terrestrial, widely considered one of the worst games of all time, suggesting that "To all the truck drivers out there who are transporting copies of Jumper: Griffin's Story to retail, please redirect your shipments to Alamogordo, New Mexico. You'll know you are in the right location when you see thousands of E.T. cartridges moving out of the way to make room for your shipment."

References

External links
 Official site
 

2008 video games
Action video games
Brash Entertainment games
Jumper (novel)
PlayStation 2 games
Single-player video games
Video games based on adaptations
Video games based on films
Video games developed in Australia
Video games set in Egypt
Video games set in Nepal
Video games set in Rome
Video games set in Tokyo
Video games with cel-shaded animation
Wii games
Xbox 360 games